The following outline is provided as an overview of and topical guide to zoology:

Zoology – study of animals.  Zoology, or "animal biology", is the branch of biology that relates to the animal kingdom, including the identification, structure, embryology, evolution, classification, habits, and distribution of all animals, both living and extinct, and how they interact with their ecosystems. The term is derived from Ancient Greek word ζῷον (zōon), i.e. "animal" and λόγος, (logos), i.e. "knowledge, study". To study the variety of animals that exist (or have existed), see list of animals by common name and lists of animals.

Essence of zoology

 Animal
 Fauna

Branches of zoology

Branches by group studied
 Acarology - study of mites and ticks
 Arthropodology - study of arthropods as a whole
Carcinology - the study of crustaceans
 Myriapodology - study of milli- and centipedes
 Arachnology - study of spiders and related animals such as scorpions, pseudoscorpions, and harvestmen, collectively called arachnids
 Entomology - study of insects
 Coleopterology - study of beetles
 Lepidopterology - study of butterflies
 Melittology - study of bees
 Myrmecology - study of ants
 Orthopterology - study of grasshoppers
 Herpetology - study of amphibians and reptiles
 Batrachology - study of amphibians including frogs and toads, salamanders, newts, and caecilians
 Cheloniology - study of turtles and tortoises
Saurology - study of lizards 
Serpentology - study of snakes
 Ichthyology - study of fish
 Malacology - study of mollusks
 Conchology - study of shells
 Teuthology - study of cephalopods
 Mammalogy - study of mammals
 Cetology - study of cetaceans
 Primatology - study of primates 
 Ornithology - study of birds
 Parasitology - study of parasites, their hosts, and the relationship between them
 Helminthology - study of parasitic worms (helminths)
 Planktology - study of plankton, various small drifting plants, animals and microorganisms that inhabit bodies of water
 Protozoology - study of protozoan, the "animal-like" (i.e., motile and heterotrophic) protists
 Nematology - study of nematodes (roundworms)

By nature of studies
 Anthrozoology - study of interaction between humans and other animals
 Behavioral ecology - study of environmental effects on animal behaviors
 Endocrinology - study of endocrine systems
 Ethology - study of animal behaviour, usually with a focus on behaviour under natural conditions, and viewing behaviour as an evolutionarily adaptive trait
 Neuroethology - study of animal behavior and its underlying mechanistic control by the nervous system
 Paleozoology - the branch of Paleontology that studies animal remains
 Zooarchaeology - study of animal remains in relation to ancient people
 Zoogeography - Zoogeography is the scientific study of geographical distribution of animal species (both historic and contemporary) in the world
 Zoography - Zoography is study of animals and their habitats (also known as descriptive zoology)
 Zoometry - is a sub-division of zoology that deals with measurements (length or size) of animal parts
 Zootomy - Human Anatomy is the study of the structure of humans and their various parts whereas Zootomy specifically refers to animal anatomy
Zoomorphology - The morphology of animals

History of zoology

 Timeline of zoology
 History of zoology (through 1859)
 History of zoology (since 1859)

Animals

Animals
 Lists of animals

Taxonomy of Animalia 
Kingdom: Animalia
 Subkingdom Parazoa
 Porifera (sponges)
 Placozoa
 Subkingdom Eumetazoa
 Radiata (unranked)
 Ctenophora (comb jellies)
 Cnidaria 
 Trilobozoa †
 Bilateria (unranked)
 Acoelomorpha
 Tullimonstrum †
 Proarticulata †
 Mesozoa (unranked)
 Orthonectida
 Rhombozoa
 Monoblastozoa
 Nephrozoa (unranked)
 Chaetognatha
 Superphylum Deuterostomia
 Chordata
 Hemichordata
 Echinodermata
 Xenoturbellida
 Vetulicolia †
 Protostomia (unranked)
 Superphylum Ecdysozoa
 Kinorhyncha
 Loricifera
 Priapulida
 Nematoda (nematodes)
 Nematomorpha
 Onychophora
 Tardigrada
 Arthropoda - includes insects, arachnids (spiders), myriapods, and crustaceans (crabs, lobsters, etc.)
 Superphylum Platyzoa
 Platyhelminthes
 Gastrotricha
 Rotifera
 Acanthocephala
 Gnathostomulida
 Micrognathozoa
 Cycliophora
 Superphylum Lophotrochozoa
 Sipuncula
 Hyolitha †
 Nemertea
 Phoronida
 Bryozoa
 Entoprocta
 Brachiopoda
 Mollusca
 Annelida

General zoology concepts
taxonomy
clade
monophyly
polyphyly
speciation
isolating mechanisms
species
phenetic species 
biological species 
recognition species 
ecological species 
pluralistic species

Notable zoologists

In alphabetical order by surname:
 Louis Agassiz (malacology, ichthyology)
 Aristotle
 Pierre Joseph Bonnaterre
 Archie Carr (herpetology, esp. cheloniology)
 Eugenie Clark (ichthyology)
 Jeff Corwin  (most animals)
 Georges Cuvier (founder of comparative morphology)
 Charles Darwin (formulated modern theory of evolution)
 Richard Dawkins (ethology)
 Dian Fossey (primatology)
 Birutė Galdikas (primatology)
 Jane Goodall (primatology)
 Victor Hensen (planktology)
 Libbie Hyman (invertebrate zoology)
 Steve Irwin (herpetology)
 William Kirby (father of entomology)
 Hans-Wilhelm Koepcke (ornithology, herpetology)
 Carl Linnaeus (father of systematics)
 Konrad Lorenz (ethology)
 David W. Macdonald (wild mammals)
 Ernst Mayr (evolutionary biologist)
 Desmond Morris (ethology)
 Richard Owen (proposed archetypes for major groups of organisms)
 Roger Tory Peterson (ornithology)
 William Emerson Ritter (marine biology)
 Thomas Say (entomology)
 Jakob von Uexküll (animal behavior, invertebrate zoology)
 E. O. Wilson (entomology, founder of sociobiology)
 more...

Zoology lists
 Lists of animals
 Ant genera (alphabetical)
 British ant species (common names)
 Non-endemic ant species introduced to Great Britain and Ireland
 Myrmecology topics
 Amblypygid genera
 Birds
 Santa Cruz County, California
 Sibley–Monroe checklist
 Domesticated animals
 Cat breeds
 Dog breeds
 Freshwater aquarium fish species
 Horse breeds
 Marine reptiles
 Externally visible animal parts
 Endangered species in the U.S.
 :Category:Lists of individual animals

Further reading
 Tree of Life Project
 Animal Diversity Web - University of Michigan's database of animals, showing taxonomic classification, images, and other information.
 ARKive - multimedia database of worldwide endangered/protected species and common species of UK.
 Scientific American Magazine (December 2005 Issue) - Getting a Leg Up on Land About the evolution of four-limbed animals from fish.

See also
 List of Russian zoologists
 Outline of biology#Zoology

References

External links

A Study Guide to Invertebrate Zoology ~ at Wikibooks
An online encyclopedia of zoology
Online Dictionary of Invertebrate Zoology
Books on Zoology at Project Gutenberg

Zoology
Zoology